The Várzea thrush (Turdus sanchezorum) is a resident breeding bird in the western Amazon. It is a cryptic species identified through molecular analysis of museum specimens. It was formerly considered conspecific with Hauxwell's thrush.

References

 

Birds described in 2011
Birds of the Amazon Basin
Thrushes
Turdus
Taxa named by John P. O'Neill (ornithologist)
Taxa named by Daniel F. Lane
Taxa named by Luciano N. Naka